Enciso may refer to:

Places 
 Enciso, La Rioja, a municipality in Spain
 Enciso, Santander, a municipality in Colombia

People 
 Simon Enciso, Filipino basketball player
 Diego Jiménez de Enciso, a playwright of the Spanish Golden Age
 Martín Fernández de Enciso, a Spanish navigator and geographer